Stuart Reed or Stuart Reid or Stewart Reed or Stewart Reid may refer to:

People
 Stuart F. Reed (1866–1935), American politician
 Stewart Reid (1867–1952), New Zealand politician
 Stuart Reid (English journalist) (born 1942), English writer and editor
 Stuart Reid (Scottish historical writer) (born 1954), writer, analyst and former soldier
 Stuart Reid (children's book author), Scottish writer
 Stuart Reid (rugby union) (born 1970), Scottish rugby player
 Stuart Reid (politician), member of the Utah State Senate
 Stuart Reid, Canadian glass artist, creator of large artwork for the Living Arts Centre in Mississauga, Ontario in 1997
 Stuart Reed, character in Silent Enemy, a Star Trek: Enterprise episode

Other uses
 Stewart Reed design